Kiambu County is a county in the former Central Province of Kenya. Its capital is Kiambu and its largest town is Thika. Kiambu County is the second most populous after Nairobi County. Kiambu County borders Nairobi and Kajiado Counties to the South, Machakos to the East, Murang'a to the North and North East, Nyandarua to the North West, and Nakuru to the West and has a population of 2,417,735.

The county is 40% rural and 60% urban owing to Nairobi's consistent growth Northwards. The Kikuyu are the dominant tribe in the county.

In 2007, Kiambu District was subdivided in two: Kiambu East and Kiambu West. Kiambu West district took Limuru, Lari and Kikuyu divisions, with Limuru as its district capital.

Climate 
The long rains start in mid-March and run to May, and cold runs between July and August.

Demographics 
According to the 2019 census, there is a total population of 2,417,735 in the county: 1,187,146 males, 1,230,454 females, and 135 intersex persons. There are 796,241 households with an average household size of 3.0 persons per household and a population density of 952 people/km2.

Administrative and political units

Administrative units 
Administratively, the county is divided into 12 constituencies, 60 county assembly wards, 97 locations and 257 sub-locations.

Electoral constituencies 
 Gatundu North Constituency
 Gatundu South Constituency
 Githunguri Constituency
 Juja Constituency
 Kabete Constituency
 Kiambaa Constituency
 Kiambu Constituency
 Kikuyu Constituency
 Lari Constituency
 Limuru Constituency
 Ruiru Constituency
 Thika Town Constituency

Political leadership 
Kimani Wamatangi is the governor of Kiambu county following the election win on a UDA Ticket and successful swearing-in after the 2022 General election. He is deputised by H.E. Rosemary Kirika who hails from Gatundu-North subcounty.

Although the capital is Kiambu town, the Executive conducts business from Thika town.

Legislature 
The legislature of Kiambu County is a unicameral County Assembly. It comprises 60 elected Members of County Assembly (MCA) from the 60 wards of the county and 27 nominated members. The members hold office for a five-year term each, renewable during the General Election. The speaker and deputy speaker of the assembly are elected by the MCAs. The County Assembly is located at Kiambu town.

Judiciary 
The Kiambu High Court was established on 20 June 2016. As of 2017, it consists of a one-judge bench. It is temporarily located at Thika waiting for a permanent building to be constructed at Kiambu, the capital.

County administration 
The county has a county administrator who is appointed by the President of Kenya. He is not part of the county government but is a representative of the President to assist with matters of administration in the county with regards to the national government.

Education 
In Kiambu County, there are 1,515 ECD centers, 948 primary schools, 365 secondary schools, 33 youth polytechnics, 165 adult education centers, one technical training institution, one technical institute of technology. There are four universities: one public, Jomo Kenyatta University of Agriculture & Technology and four private universities, Gretsa University, UMMA University, Mount Kenya University and Zetech University.

Health 
Kiambu County has a total of 505 health facilities: 108 are public, 64 faith-based, and 333 private. Kiambu County has 2,652 health personnel of different cadre with a doctor/population ratio of 1:6,667, while the nurse population ratio is at 1:1,110. The immunization coverage is at 89%, close to the national target of 90%.

According to 2016 estimates, HIV prevalence is at 5.6% (below the national 5.9%) and the county is ranked 6th in terms of HIV burden.

Transport and communication 

There are 19 Post Offices.

Trade and commerce 
There are 302 trading centers, 118 markets, 364 retail supermarkets, 5,813 registered businesses, 5,807 licensed retail traders and 5,740 licensed wholesale traders.

Tatu City is a special economic zone and an industrial park located in Ruiru sub-county. Apart from real estate, individuals and organizations have also invested in processing. Companies operating in Kiambu include: Farmers Choice Ltd, 25 Kenchic Co. Ltd, Brookside Dairies, Githunguri Dairies, Ndumberi Dairies, Limuru Milk and Palmside Dairies.

Thika sub-county has 58 industries, including Bidco Oil Industries, Devki Steel Mills, Broadway Bakeries and Kenblest, among others.

Constituencies and sub-counties 
The county has twelve constituencies and forteen sub-counties.

Sub-counties
Sub-counties are mostly derived from constituency boundaries but two constituencies, Ruiru and Thika, have two sub-counties each.

 Gatundu North Sub-county 
 Gatundu South Sub-county
 Githunguri Sub-county
 Githurai Sub-county
 Kabete Sub-county
 Kiambaa Sub-county
 Kiambu Sub-county
 Kikuyu Sub-county
 Juja Sub-county
 Lari Sub-county
 Limuru Sub-county
 Ruiru Sub-county
 Thika East Sub-county
 Thika West Sub-county

Population

Nairobi Metro 

Kiambu County is within Greater Nairobi, which consists of four out of 47 counties in Kenya. The counties are:
 Source: NairobiMetro/ Kenya Census

Stats

Nairobi Metro

Urbanisation 
 Source: OpenDataKenya

Wealth/Poverty Level 
 Source: OpenDataKenya Worldbank

Central Kenya Region

Urbanisation 
 Source: OpenDataKenya

Wealth/poverty level 
 Source: OpenDataKenya Worldbank

External links 
 Kenya National Bureau of Statistics
 The Council of Governors
 Kiambu

See also 
 Gitombo
 Kabete
 Kijabe
 Kiratina
 Wilfred Kiboro
 Nakuru County
 Meru County
 Nairobi County
 Kajiado County
 Machakos County
 Muranga County
 Nyandarua County

References 

 
Counties of Kenya